The Queensland Under-16 rugby league team, also known as Queensland Under-16s or Queensland U16, represents Queensland in the sport of rugby league at an under-16 age level. Since 2008, the team has played an annual fixture against the New South Wales Under-16s team as a curtain raiser to a State of Origin game. The team features players selected from Queensland's premier under-16 rugby league competition, the Cyril Connell Cup. They are administered by the Queensland Rugby League.

History
Prior to 2008, junior interstate matches were contested at under-17 and under-19 levels. In 2008, with the advent of the National Youth Competition, the age levels switched to an under-16 and under-18 format to keep in line with the NSWRL's existing SG Ball Cup and Harold Matthews Cup competitions and the QRL's Mal Meninga Cup and Cyril Connell Cup competitions, which would begin in 2009.

Queensland suffered defeat in the first under-16 Origin fixture in 2008, with a side that featured future NRL players Kyle Feldt, Ben Hampton, Lachlan Maranta and Korbin Sims. They recorded their first win a year later, defeating New South Wales 30–10 in 2009. That team featured future New Zealand international Jason Taumalolo. From 2010 to 2013, Queensland suffered four straight defeats before winning both fixtures against New South Wales in 2014 and 2015.

Players
Players selected for the Queensland under-16 team are usually contracted with a National Rugby League (NRL) side and, until 2017, played in the Cyril Connell Cup. Occasionally players who are contracted to Sydney-based NRL sides, who play in the Harold Matthews Cup, are selected. In 2008, before the Cyril Connell Cup began, players were selected from the under-16 representative carnival in Proserpine. Each pre-season the Queensland Rugby League will select an under-16 squad featuring players in contention for the mid-season fixture. The squad participates in a weekend camp at the Queensland Academy of Sport.

In 2017, the QRL ended the Cyril Connell Cup, replacing it with a three-day statewide carnival in which the Queensland under-16 side would be selected from.

In 2019, no under-16 State of Origin was held, with both states instead holding a City vs Country fixture. On 29 September 2019, Queensland Country under-16 defeated City 44–4, and a Queensland under-16 merit side was named after the game.

Results

2008
Played as a curtain raiser to Game I of the 2008 State of Origin series.

2009
Played as a curtain raiser to Game I of the 2009 State of Origin series.

2010
Played as a curtain raiser to Game III of the 2010 State of Origin series.

2011
Played as a curtain raiser to Game I of the 2011 State of Origin series.

2012
Played as a curtain raiser to Game I of the 2012 State of Origin series.

2013
Played as a curtain raiser to Game I of the 2013 State of Origin series.

2014
Played as a curtain raiser to Game I of the 2014 State of Origin series.

2015
Played as a curtain raiser to Game I of the 2015 State of Origin series.

2016
Played as a curtain raiser to Game I of the 2016 State of Origin series.

2017
Played as a curtain raiser to Game III of the 2017 State of Origin series.

2018
Played as a curtain raiser to the Round 18 Brisbane Broncos-Warriors game.

2019
Merit side selected after the 2019 Under-16 Queensland City vs Country fixture.

See also
Queensland state rugby league team
Queensland Residents rugby league team
Queensland under-20 rugby league team
Queensland under-18 rugby league team

References

Res
Rugby League State of Origin
Rugby league representative teams in Queensland